Jean Behourt, born in the first half of the 16th century in Rouen where he died in 1621, was a French grammarian and playwright.

A regent of the collège des Bons Enfants de Rouen from 1586 to 1620, Jean Behourt wrote three tragedies for this collège: Polixène, tragicomedy in three acts, with choirs, derived from the first book of Histoires tragiques by Pierre Boisteau, dedicated to the princess of Montpensier, presented on 7 September 1597, Esaü, ou le chasseur, tragedy in five acts, dédicated to the duke of Montpensier, presented on 2 August 1598, and Hypsicratée ou la Magnanimité, dedicated to Georges de Montigny, tragedy in five acts, presented in the same location.

In 1607, Béhourd also drafted a compendium of Despautère's Latin grammar which, abbreviated in turn, has long been used in colleges under the name Petit Behourt.

Works 
1597: Polixène, Rouen, Raphaël du Petit-Val
1598: Esaü, ou le chasseur, Rouen, Raphaël du Petit-Val
1604: Hypsicratée ou la Magnanimité, Rouen, Raphaël du Petit-Val
1603: Sententiæ puriores cum dictis festivioribus in usum pueritiæ ex Ovidio excerptæ ingulis, adjecta est sua epigraphe, Rouen, Jean Osmon
1684: Grammatica Joannis Despauterii, in commodiorem docendi et discendi usum redacta, Lyon, Antoine Thomaz
 Despauterius minor seu Joannis Despauterii, latinae grammatices epitome, in commodiorem docendi et discendi usum redacta ... Adjectiva est facilioris intelligentiae causa et gallica versuum Despauterii, 8 v., Caen, Guillaume Richard, [s.d.], 514 p.

Bibliography 
 Pierre-François Godard de Beauchamps, Recherches sur les théâtres de France depuis l'année onze cens soixante-un, jusques à present, Paris, Prault père, 1735
 Émile Faguet, Histoire de la littérature française depuis les origines jusqu’à la fin du XVIe, Paris, Plon, Nourrit et Cie, 1900
 Édouard Gosselin, Recherches sur les origines et l'histoire du théâtre à Rouen avant Pierre Corneille, Rouen, Cagniard, 1868
 François Parfaict, Histoire du théâtre françois depuis son origine jusqu'à présent. Avec la vie des plus célèbres poëtes dramatiques, un catalogue exact de leurs pièces, & des notes historiques & critiques, Paris, P. G. Le Mercier, 1745–49
 Édouard Frère, Manuel du bibliographe normand, Rouen, Le Brument, 1860, p. 88.
 Théodore-Éloi Lebreton, Biographie rouennaise, Rouen, Le Brument, 1865, p. 25.

See also 
 French Renaissance literature

External links 
 Jean Behourt on data.bnf.fr

16th-century French dramatists and playwrights
17th-century French dramatists and playwrights
17th-century French male writers
Grammarians from France
Writers from Rouen
Year of birth missing
1621 deaths